Bulent Diken (born 1964) is a Danish-Turkish philosopher and sociologist who teaches at Lancaster University. He has studied urban planning at the Aarhus School of Architecture.
He is known for his research on social theory, post-structuralism, nihilism, political philosophy, urban sociology, and immigration.
During 1998-1999 he was an assistant professor at Roskilde University, Department of Geography.

Bibliography
 Revolt, Revolution, Critique: The Paradox of Society 
 The Sociology of Terrorism
 Nihilism (2009)
 Strangers, Ambivalence and Social Theory (1998)
 Sociology Through the Projector (2007) (with Carsten Bagge Lausten)
 The Culture of Exception: Sociology Facing the Camp (2005) (with Carsten Bagge Lausten)

See also
 Stanley Rosen

References

External links
 Personal Website of Bulent Diken
 Bulent Diken at Lancaster University

21st-century philosophers
Philosophers of nihilism
Continental philosophers
1964 births
Living people
Danish philosophers
Political philosophers
Poststructuralists
Modernity
Academic staff of Roskilde University
Danish sociologists
Academics of Lancaster University
Place of birth missing (living people)
Aarhus University alumni